Harry Haslam (30 July 1921 – 11 September 1986) was a footballer and manager in the Football League between the 1940s and 1980s.

Haslam played for Rochdale as an amateur, before moving to Oldham Athletic in 1946-47, for whom he made two League appearances. After a short spell with Brighton & Hove Albion he moved to Leyton Orient for 1948-49, with whom he made 7 League appearances, before joining Guildford City.

He managed Tonbridge in the 1960s, winning the Kent Senior Cup in 1964–65, and went on to manage the club on a record 552 occasions. Haslam became manager of Luton Town in 1972 and he led them to promotion to the Football League First Division for 1974-75.

In 1978, he became manager of Sheffield United, and he remained in charge until 1980. Under Haslam's management, Sheffield United almost signed Argentinian footballer Diego Maradona who was then 17 years old. However the agreed fee was increased and Maradona, who had made his way to the airport, had to remain in Argentina for the time being.

References

1921 births
1986 deaths
English Football League players
Rochdale A.F.C. players
Oldham Athletic A.F.C. players
Brighton & Hove Albion F.C. players
Leyton Orient F.C. players
Guildford City F.C. players
English Football League managers
Luton Town F.C. managers
Sheffield United F.C. managers
Association football defenders
English footballers
English football managers